Pico Ruivo is the highest peak on Madeira Island. It can be reached only by foot, usually either from Pico do Arieiro (3rd highest) after a strenuous hike, or from Achada do Teixeira via a shorter, easier trail. There is an additional trail leading west to Encumeada. The hut just below the summit is now open, and there are water tap and toilets available.

See also
 List of islands by highest point
 List of European ultra prominent peaks

References

External links

Geography of Madeira
Mountains of Portugal
Tourist attractions in Madeira
Ruivo